Paul Joseph Revere (Sept 10, 1832 – July 4, 1863) was a Brevet Brigadier General in the Union Army during the American Civil War.

Early life

He was born in Suffolk County, Massachusetts.  He was the grandson and namesake of Revolutionary War patriot Paul Revere. He was one of the three grandsons of Paul Revere who fought for the Union, another being Joseph Warren Revere. He graduated from Harvard University in 1852.

Career
In July 1861, he was commissioned a major in the 20th Massachusetts Infantry. In October 1861, at the Battle of Ball's Bluff in Virginia, Revere was wounded and captured by the Confederate States Army. He was paroled in February 1862 and officially exchanged in May 1862. In September 1862, Revere participated in the Battle of Antietam, in which he suffered a second wound and Edward Hutchinson Revere, another of Paul Revere's grandsons, was killed. On July 2, 1863, Revere, by now colonel of his regiment, was mortally wounded at the Battle of Gettysburg and died two days later.

See also
List of Massachusetts generals in the American Civil War

References

External links

Civil War Saga
NVRPA
Harvard University

1832 births
1863 deaths
People from Suffolk County, Massachusetts
Union Army colonels
Paul Joseph
Harvard University alumni
Military personnel from Massachusetts
Union military personnel killed in the American Civil War